Løkjelsvatnet or Lykilsvatnet is a regulated lake in the municipality of Etne in Vestland county, Norway. Water from the lake falls  vertically in tunnels and pipelines to the Hardeland hydroelectric power station. The site is operated by Haugaland Kraft.

The Haugesund section of the Norwegian Mountain Touring Association operates the Løkjelsvatn cabin on the west shore of the lake, and there are marked maintain paths connecting the area to the rest of a nationwide network of paths.  The lake has a rich population of brown trout which is popular among fishermen.

A group of eleven domesticated reindeer were introduced to the Etnefjellet mountain area in 1990, and the herd has adopted the Løkjelsvatnet lake area as its main habitat. This herd is now viewed and administered as if it were a wild herd.

See also
List of lakes in Norway

References

Lakes of Vestland
Etne